Crossroads is an American television anthology series based on the activities of clergy from different denominations. It aired from October 1955 to June 1956 on ABC. The series' second season aired from October 1956 to June 1957 in syndication. It was retitled The Way of Life during syndication. Story technical advisers were credited as Fr. George Barry Ford, USN Captain Maurice M. Witherspoon Presbyterian Minister, Vice-President of the Military Chaplains Association and Rabbi William Franklin Rosenblum. The entire series is preserved at the UCLA Film & Television Archive in Los Angeles, California.

Overview
The episodes, which often had deep spiritual themes, were usually set in the 1950s, but some were framed for an earlier era.

The series featured numerous guest stars, many of whom appeared in several episodes throughout the series' run. James Dean appeared in a 1955 episode, "Broadway Trust", along with Lloyd Bridges and Mary Treen. The episode aired five weeks after Dean died in an automobile crash in September 1955.

Victor Jory was cast in the 1957 episode "Lone Star Preacher", a dramatization of the Texas Baptist pastor George Washington Truett, with Barbara Eiler as his wife, Jo Truett.

Other guest stars include:

 Suzanne Alexander
 Hugh Beaumont
 Noah Beery, Jr.
 Edgar Buchanan
 Chuck Connors
 Jeanne Cooper
 Johnny Crawford
 Donald Crisp
 Richard Deacon
 Don DeFore
 Elinor Donahue
 Brian Donlevy
 Howard Duff
 Barbara Eden
 Stuart Erwin
 Yvonne Lime Fedderson
 Arthur Franz
 Virginia Gregg
 Barbara Hale
 Taylor Holmes
 Vivi Janiss
 Russell Johnson
 Michael Landon
 Gene Lockhart
 Jimmy Lydon
 Barton MacLane
 Hugh Marlowe 
 Strother Martin
 Kevin McCarthy
 Charles McGraw
 Eve Miller
 Martin Milner
 Gerald Mohr
 J. Carrol Naish
 Jeanette Nolan
 Susan Oliver
 Maureen O'Sullivan
 Jerry Paris
 Leo Penn
 Vincent Price 
 Roy Roberts
 Lyle Talbot
 Regis Toomey
 Lee Van Cleef
 Bobs Watson
 Will J. White
 James Whitmore
 Grant Withers

Broadcast history
In its first season on ABC, Crossroads followed the long-running sitcom The Adventures of Ozzie and Harriet on the Friday evening schedule. It was scheduled opposite Our Miss Brooks on CBS and The Life of Riley on NBC.

ABC canceled Crossroads after one season. The series was then picked up for a second season, airing in syndication from October 1956 to June 1957, for a total of 78 episodes.

Sample episodes:

 "A Bell for O'Donnell"  – A reverend (Edmund Lowe) learns a lesson in forgiveness when he is swindled by a fast-talking con man.
 "Call for Help" – A priest (Richard Carlson) works with troubled youths when a gang fight leads to a fatal shooting.
 "Cleanup" – A pastor (Vincent Price) exhorts his parishioners to take back their city from the gangsters and corrupt politicians who have taken it over.
 "Dig or Die, Brother Hyde" – A new preacher (Hugh Marlowe) on the harsh Dakota frontier is severely tested.
 "God's Healing" – Vincent Price plays a Pennsylvania Priest named Alfred Price, who heals an old woman's embittered heart.
 "The Good Thief" – A US Army chaplain (James Whitmore) is tortured by Red Chinese captors for ministering to his fellow prisoners of war.
 "The Judge" – Brian Donlevy does double duty in a lawless town as a preacher and a judge.
 "Mother O'Brien" – A police detective is torn between family and duty when his younger brother is involved in a petty crime.

See also
Insight

This is the Life (TV series)

References

External links 
 
 Crossroads at CVTA, with episode list

1955 American television series debuts
1957 American television series endings
1950s American anthology television series
American Broadcasting Company original programming
1950s American drama television series
Black-and-white American television shows
English-language television shows
First-run syndicated television programs in the United States
American television series revived after cancellation
American religious television series